Jayabheri is a 1959 Indian Telugu-language biographical film directed by P. Pullayya who co-wrote the script with Acharya Aatreya. The film is based on the life of poet Kaasinath and stars Akkineni Nageswara Rao and Anjali Devi. The film was produced by Vasireddy Narayana Rao with music composed by Pendyala Nageswara Rao.

Jayabheri won the Certificate of Merit for Best Feature Film in Telugu at the 7th National Film Awards. The music from the film was widely played on the radio. The film was simultaneously released in Tamil as Kalaivaanan.

Plot 
The film is set during the 16001700s, during the Vijayanagara Empire at Vidyanagaram. It is the hometown of high scholars and the elite communities where Kasinatha Sastry — an orthodox Brahmin — was brought up by his elder brother Viswanatha Sastry and his sister-in-law Annapurna.

A low caste Bhagavatar called Bhachanollu is shown visiting Vidyanagaram. During this event, an extraordinary dancer, Manjulavani, challenged the people of Vidyanagaram. Soon after the dance, Kasinath competes and emerges victorious. Viswambhara Sastry — Kasi's mentor — admonishes him because he has dragged Goddess Saraswati onto the streets. Kasi argues that art has no caste or community and should hold public admiration. Viswambhara becomes furious and knocks Kasi out.

Viswanatha berates and forces Kasi to apologize to his mentor. Kasi and Manju fall for each other. He gives a show, ignoring the ordinance of village heads and his elders for which he has been ostracised from the religion. Soon after, Kasi marries Manju, and they become beloved by the public with their performances. King Vijayananda Ramagajapati is impressed and invites them to his kingdom, where Dharmadhikari narrates the story of Kasi.

It transpires that Kasi is ineligible for the honor, and Kasi strives for victory over all the scholars in the council. Even Viswambhara appreciates him. Keeping that grudge in mind, Dharmadhikari plots revenge by using a court dancer Amurthamba (Rajasulochana), who gets Kasi drunk. Once he gets drunk, Kasi is unable to sing in court and the King sends him to prison. Manju arrives in time and reveals the conspiracy of Dharmadhikari.

Later, Kasi and Manju return to Vidyanagaram, but Kasi cannot get off his vices. He loses his wealth and starts ill-treating Manju. Learning of the developments, Annapurna reaches Kasi secretly and makes him repent and reform. Viswanatha Sastry does not allow Annapurna to return, so she commits suicide, but Kasi and Manju get her back with their devotional power. At last, the entire society realizes the couple's innocence.

Cast 

 Akkineni Nageswara Rao as Kasinatha Sastry
 Anjali Devi as Manjulavani
 Santha Kumari as Annapoorna
 Rajasulochana as Amrutha
 Relangi as Bangarayya
 S. V. Ranga Rao as Raja Vijayananda Rama Gajapati
 Gummadi as Viswanatha Sastry
 V. Nagayya as Viswambhara Sastry
 Ramana Reddy as Narayya
 Suryakantham as Ratnam
 Mukkamala as Dharmadhikari
 Maddali Krishnamurthy
 Peketi Sivaram as Sanjeevi
 Chadalavada as Raghavulu
 Surabhi Kamalabai	as Ranganayaki

Soundtrack

Awards 
National Film Awards
 1959: Certificate of Merit for Best Feature Film in Telugu

Filmfare Awards South
Filmfare Award for Best Film – Telugu

References

External links 
 

1959 films
Best Telugu Feature Film National Film Award winners
Films directed by P. Pullayya
Films scored by Pendyala Nageswara Rao
Indian black-and-white films